Amanda Chudoba-Obrigewitch (born May 11, 1990) is a Canadian trap shooter.  She was born in Edmonton, Alberta, Canada and shoots for the Canadian International Trap team, and represents Canada in Women's trap shooting.

Chudoba won Gold at the 2015 Pan American Games in Toronto, Ontario, Canada. This allowed Canada a quota spot for Women's Trap Shooting for the 2016 Olympics in Rio.

External links
Amanda Chudoba-Obrigwitch Website
Amanda Chudoba ISSF Profile
Amanda Chudoba Team Canada Profile

References

1990 births
Living people
Canadian female sport shooters
Doping cases in shooting
Shooters at the 2015 Pan American Games
Trap and double trap shooters
Sportspeople from Edmonton
Pan American Games medalists in shooting
Pan American Games gold medalists for Canada
Shooters at the 2019 Pan American Games
Pan American Games bronze medalists for Canada
Medalists at the 2015 Pan American Games
Medalists at the 2019 Pan American Games
20th-century Canadian women
21st-century Canadian women